The women's double regu sepak takraw competition at the 2006 Asian Games in Doha was held from 11 December to 13 December at the Al-Sadd Indoor Hall.

Squads

Results 
All times are Arabia Standard Time (UTC+03:00)

Preliminary

Group X

|-
|11 December||09:00
|align=right|
|align=center|2–0
|align=left|
|21–11||21–9||
|-
|11 December||10:00
|align=right|
|align=center|2–1
|align=left|
|20–22||21–15||16–14
|-
|11 December||18:00
|align=right|
|align=center|1–2
|align=left|
|21–18||17–21||12–15
|-
|11 December||19:00
|align=right|
|align=center|2–0
|align=left|
|21–14||21–11||
|-
|12 December||10:00
|align=right|
|align=center|0–2
|align=left|
|10–21||6–21||
|-
|12 December||14:00
|align=right|
|align=center|1–2
|align=left|
|21–17||16–21||13–15

Group Y

|-
|11 December||14:00
|align=right|
|align=center|2–0
|align=left|
|21–10||21–9||
|-
|11 December||15:00
|align=right|
|align=center|2–0
|align=left|
|21–10||21–14||
|-
|11 December||18:00
|align=right|
|align=center|2–1
|align=left|
|21–16||15–21||15–10
|-
|11 December||19:00
|align=right|
|align=center|2–0
|align=left|
|21–10||21–10||
|-
|12 December||09:00
|align=right|
|align=center|0–2
|align=left|
|14–21||8–21||
|-
|12 December||15:00
|align=right|
|align=center|1–2
|align=left|
|22–24||23–21||14–16

Knockout round

Semifinals

|-
|13 December||09:00
|align=right|
|align=center|2–1
|align=left|
|19–21||21–18||15–13
|-
|13 December||10:00
|align=right|
|align=center|2–1
|align=left|
|21–16||12–21||15–11

Final

|-
|13 December||16:00
|align=right|
|align=center|2–0
|align=left|
|21–16||21–16||

References 

Official Website
Results

Sepak takraw at the 2006 Asian Games